Trevin Dewayne Giles (born August 6, 1992) is an American mixed martial artist (MMA). Giles currently competes in the welterweight division in the Ultimate Fighting Championship (UFC).

Background
Giles was born in San Antonio, Texas, and was a football defensive player at Alief Taylor High School in Houston, Texas. Giles started martial arts training when he was 20 years old.

Mixed martial arts career

Early career 
Giles started his professional MMA career in 2014, with a triangle choke submission of Angelus Raymond McFarlane. He would go on to amass a 4–0 record fighting in the Texas circuit.

He fought outside of Texas for the first time on March 25, 2015, when he was scheduled to fight Brendan Allen at Legacy FC 52. Giles beat the future UFC middleweight by rear-naked choke.

After a first-round TKO of Robert McCarthy at Caribbean UFF 10, Giles was scheduled to fight Robert McCarthy at RFA 41. Giles submitted McCarthy with a rear-naked choke in the second round.

At Legacy FC 59, Giles was scheduled to fight another future UFC middleweight in Ike Villanueva. He beat Villanueava by a third-round arm-triangle choke.

Giles headlined LFA 3 in a middleweight bout with Ryan Spann. He beat Spann by split decision, to keep his undefeated record.

Ultimate Fighting Championship
Giles made his UFC debut on July 8, 2017, against James Bochnovic at UFC 213. He won the fight via knockout in round two.

His next fight came on December 9, 2017, at UFC Fight Night: Swanson vs. Ortega against Antônio Braga Neto. He won the fight via knockout in the third round.

Giles faced Zak Cummings on May 18, 2019, at UFC Fight Night: dos Anjos vs. Lee. He lost the fight via a guillotine choke submission in the third round.

As the last fight of his rookie contract in the UFC, Giles faced Gerald Meerschaert on August 3, 2019, at UFC on ESPN 5. He lost the fight via technical submission in the third round due to a guillotine choke.

Giles was scheduled to face Antônio Arroyo on February 8, 2020, at UFC 247. However Arroyo pulled out a day before the event due to medical issues and he was replaced by James Krause. He won the back-and-forth bout via split decision. The win also earned Giles his first Fight of the Night bonus award.

Giles was expected to face Jun Yong Park on August 1, 2020, at UFC Fight Night: Brunson vs. Shahbazyan. However, Park was removed from the bout on July 23 due to alleged travel issues and was replaced by Kevin Holland. Just prior to his walkout, Giles fainted and the fight was canceled.

Giles faced Bevon Lewis on November 7, 2020, at UFC on ESPN: Santos vs. Teixeira. He won the fight via technical knockout.

Giles was scheduled to face Dricus du Plessis on March 20, 2021, at UFC on ESPN 21. However, du Plessis pulled out due to visa issues and was replaced by Roman Dolidze. He won the close bout via unanimous decision. 9 out of 17 media members awarded the decision victory to Giles.

The match between Giles and Dricus du Plessis was rescheduled and eventually took place on July 10, 2021, at UFC 264. Giles lost the fight via knockout in round two.

Giles faced Michael Morales on January 22, 2022, at UFC 270. He lost the bout via technical knockout in round one.

Giles faced Louis Cosce on September 10, 2022, at UFC Fight Night: Sandhagen vs. Song. He won the fight via unanimous decision.

Giles is scheduled to face Preston Parsons on March 15, 2023 at UFC on ESPN 43.

Personal life 
Trevin and his wife Coreyonna have a son (born 2019). Giles was a police officer, working for the Houston Police Department. Giles announced his retirement from police work in an instagram post in February 2022.

Championships and awards 
 Ultimate Fighting Championship
Fight of the Night (One time)

Mixed martial arts record

|-
|Win
|align=center|15–4
|Louis Cosce
|Decision (unanimous)
|UFC Fight Night: Sandhagen vs. Song 
|
|align=center|3
|align=center|5:00
|Las Vegas, Nevada, United States
|
|-
|Loss
|align=center|14–4
|Michael Morales
|TKO (punches)
|UFC 270
|
|align=center|1
|align=center|4:06
|Anaheim, California, United States
|
|-
|Loss
|align=center|14–3
|Dricus du Plessis
|KO (punches)
|UFC 264 
|
|align=center|2
|align=center|1:41
|Las Vegas, Nevada, United States
|
|-
|Win
|align=center|14–2
|Roman Dolidze
|Decision (unanimous)
|UFC on ESPN: Brunson vs. Holland 
|
|align=center|3
|align=center|5:00
|Las Vegas, Nevada, United States
|  
|-
|Win
|align=center|13–2
|Bevon Lewis
|TKO (punches)
|UFC on ESPN: Santos vs. Teixeira
|
|align=center|3
|align=center|1:26
|Las Vegas, Nevada, United States
|
|-
| Win
|align=center|12–2
|James Krause
|Decision (split)
|UFC 247 
|
|align=center|3
|align=center|5:00
|Houston, Texas, United States
|
|-
|Loss
|align=center|11–2
|Gerald Meerschaert
|Technical Submission (guillotine choke)
|UFC on ESPN: Covington vs. Lawler
|
|align=center|3
|align=center|1:49
|Newark, New Jersey, United States
|
|-
|Loss
|align=center|11–1
|Zak Cummings
|Submission (guillotine choke)
|UFC Fight Night: dos Anjos vs. Lee
|
|align=center|3
|align=center|4:01
|Rochester, New York, United States
|
|-
|Win
|align=center|11–0
|Antônio Braga Neto
|KO (punches)
|UFC Fight Night: Swanson vs. Ortega
|
|align=center|3
|align=center|2:27
|Fresno, California, United States
|
|-
|Win
|align=center|10–0
|James Bochnovic
|KO (punch)
|UFC 213
|
|align=center|2
|align=center|2:54
|Las Vegas, Nevada, United States
|
|-
|Win
|align=center|9–0
|Ryan Spann
|Decision (split)
|LFA 3
|
|align=center|3
|align=center|5:00
|Lake Charles, Louisiana, United States
|
|-
|Win
|align=center|8–0
|Ike Villanueva
|Submission (arm-triangle choke)
|Legacy FC 59
|
|align=center|3
|align=center|1:45
|Humble, Texas, United States
|
|-
|Win
|align=center|7–0
|Josh Clark
|Submission (rear-naked choke)
|RFA 41
|
|align=center|2
|align=center|1:10
|San Antonio, Texas, United States
|
|-
|Win
|align=center|6–0
|Robert McCarthy
|TKO (punches)
|Caribbean Ultimate Fist Fighting 10
|
|align=center|1
|align=center|3:06
|Port of Spain, Trinidad and Tobago
|
|-
|Win
|align=center|5–0
|Brendan Allen
|Submission (rear-naked choke)
|Legacy FC 52
|
|align=center|2
|align=center|1:47
|Lake Charles, Louisiana, United States
|
|-
|Win
|align=center|4–0
|Larry Crowe
|TKO (punches)
|Fury Fighting 8
|
|align=center|2
|align=center|1:48
|Humble, Texas, United States
|
|-
|Win
|align=center|3–0
|Terrance Ferguson
|TKO (punches)
|Fury Fighting 7
|
|align=center|1
|align=center|3:18
|Humble, Texas, United States
|
|-
|Win
|align=center|2–0
|Patrick Hutton
|Submission (armbar)
|Legacy FC 31
|
|align=center|1
|align=center|2:11
|Houston, Texas, United States
|
|-
|Win
|align=center|1–0
|Angelus Raymond McFarlane
|Submission (inverted triangle choke)
|Legacy FC 27
|
|align=center|1
|align=center|1:15
|Houston, Texas, United States
|
|-

See also
List of current UFC fighters
List of male mixed martial artists

References

External links
 
^ 

1992 births
Living people
American male mixed martial artists
Middleweight mixed martial artists
Mixed martial artists utilizing Brazilian jiu-jitsu
Mixed martial artists from Texas
Ultimate Fighting Championship male fighters
American practitioners of Brazilian jiu-jitsu
Sportspeople from San Antonio